The Commander of the Russian Aerospace Forces is the chief commanding authority of the Russian Aerospace Forces. The position was created in 2015, when the Russian Air Force, Russian Air and Missile Defence Forces and Russian Space Forces where placed under a unified command. He is appointed by the President of Russia. The current commander is Army General Sergey Surovikin.

List of Commanders

References

Russia
Military of Russia
Military of the Soviet Union
Commanders-in-chief of the Russian Air Force